Decazeville is a commune in the Aveyron department in the Occitanie region in southern France.

The commune was created in the 19th century because of the Industrial Revolution and was named after the Duke of Decazes (1780–1860), the founder of the factory that created the town. Viviez-Decazeville station has rail connections to Brive-la-Gaillarde, Figeac and Rodez.

History
The town is built on coal. La Salle (the former name) produced coal since the 16th century. It was exported in small quantities to Bordeaux.

Louis XIV and his successors gave mines to their mistresses. The Duke of Decazes inherited such mines. In 1826 he created, with the help of a technician named Cabrol, the "Houillères et Fonderies de l'Aveyron" (Mines and Foundries of Aveyron) which developed to make this small village a center of ironworking and industry.

Under Napoléon III, the city took the name of Decazeville. A statue of Decazes dressed in a Roman toga was erected.

The high point of iron production was reached early in the 20th century, when some 9000 employees produced 1 million tons of steel. Production decreased after changes in the industry that shifted many jobs offshore. A noted strike of mine workers occurred from 1961 to 1962. Some 1500 miners spent 66 days in the mines from 23 December 1961 to 26 February 1962. The last mines closed in June 2001.

Although Decazeville felt the full brunt of the decline in the mining industry, the town has diversified its economy. It now has metallurgy, woodworking, metal fabrication, and production of steel tubing.

The town has a geological museum named after Pierre Vetter, its founder. It is dedicated to coal strata. The open-pit mine La Découverte is open to the public.

The modern church of Notre-Dame has a celebrated painting of the Way of the Cross by Gustave Moreau.

Population

Twin towns — sister cities
Decazeville is twinned with:

  Utrillas, Spain
  Coazze, Italy

Personalities
Élie Decazes (1780–1860), founder of the town and president of ministers under Louis XVIII.
Henri Agel (1911–2008), cinema critic and philosopher who died in Decazeville.
Lilian Bathelot (born 1959), novelist who spent his childhood in Decazeville.
Jean-Claude Berejnoï (born in 1939), rugby player born in Decazeville.
François Gracchus Cabrol (1793–1882), captain in the Napleonic army at 21, director of the mining enterprise. Buried in Decazeville.
Emma Calvé (born 1858), singer born in Decazeville.
Maurice Frot (1928–2004), writer.
Serge Mesonès (1948–2001), footballer
Jacques Monfrin (1924–1998), philologist born in Decazeville.
Paul Ramadier, mayor of Decazeville from 1919 to 1959, governor of Aveyron, and minister.
Jean-Pierre Timbaud (1904–1941), World War II Resistance fighter worked briefly in the mines as a child.

See also
 List of places named after people
 Héroïnes, a 1997 film partly set in Decazeville
 Virtual 3D tour in GE
Communes of the Aveyron department

References

Communes of Aveyron
Rouergue
Aveyron communes articles needing translation from French Wikipedia